Oleg Anatolyevich Peshkov (3 August 1970 – 24 November 2015) was a combat pilot in the Russian air force who was shot down by a Turkish fighter near the Syria-Turkey border on 24 November 2015. Although he initially survived bailing out of the plane with his parachute, he was shot while descending by militants on the ground.

Early life
Peshkov was born on 3 August 1970 in Kosikha village. His family subsequently moved to Ust-Kamenogorsk, where he graduated from secondary school in 1985. He then went on to graduate with honors from the Sverdlovsk Suvorov Military School in 1987, and then the Kharkov Higher Military Aviation School of Pilots named after Sergey Gritsevets.

Aviation career
After graduation, Peshkov initially served MiG-21 instructor pilot, based at the Kan airbase in the Kyrgyz SSR, and from 1992 to 1998 he was stationed at the Vozzhaevka aviation garrison as part of reconnaissance aviation regiment. Subsequently he was based in the Primorsky Krai a squadron commander. In August 2008 he participated in the Russo-Georgian War in South Ossetia. The next year he became head of the flight safety service at the 4th State Center for Aviation Personnel Training, based in Lipetsk. An experienced pilot, he totaled over 1700 flight hours, mastering the L-39, MiG-21, Su-24, and Su-34 aircraft.

Death in Syrian war
On 24 November 2015 Peshkov flew as pilot-in-command on a combat mission over Syria in an Su-24M, tasked with making an airstrike. After allegedly slightly entering Turkish airspace during the flight, the aircraft was shot down over the province of Latakia near the Syrian-Turkish border by a Turkish F-16C. Both he and his navigator Konstantin Murakhtin managed to eject from the aircraft, with Murakhtin able to make a safe landing outside of the firing zone before he was rescued by a joint operation of Russian and Syrian special forces; however, Peshkov was shot in his parachute by rebels on the ground who identified themselves as members of the Grey Wolves. The shooting of an ejecting aircraft pilot is in contravention of Article 42 of the 1977 Protocol I of the Geneva Convention. Initially after the incident, Alparslan Çelik claimed that his forces shot both the pilot and navigator while they were descending in their parachutes. Immediately after Peshkov's death, videos of the militants with his body were posted on the Internet. On 31 March 2016 over a dozen people were arrested by the Turkish police in Izmir in connection with the attack, but later they were released. On 29 November 2015, Peshkov's body was taken to a morgue in Hatay Province, and then it was flown to Ankara. The autopsy by Russian doctors found eight bullet wounds and determined that he died between 10:00 and 11:30 AM Moscow time on 24 November 2015.

Funeral 
On 30 November 2015 the coffin with Peshkov's body was received by Russian diplomats in Ankara and subsequently repatriated to Russia by a special flight. Before landing at Chkalovsky Air Base, the plane was given a fighter escort upon entering Russian airspace. On 2 December Oleg Peshkov's remains were buried at the central alley of the Lipetsk cemetery with full military honors and an estimated 10,000 people attending.

Memorialization

In Russia 
Various cities in Russia have memorial plaques honoring Peshkov. On 18 August 2016, aviation day in Russia, an Su-34 was named in his honor, with his name and an image of a gold star painted on the fuselage. The Yekaterinburg Suvorov Military School, which he graduated from in 1987, hosts a parachute jump in his honor. The 2021 Russian film "Sky", is based on Peshkov's life.

Abroad 
Turkish poet Husein Haydar wrote the poem "Apologies to the Great Russian People", expressing condolences to Peshkov's mother. In December 2015, a graffiti portrait of Peshkov appeared on a house in Novi Sad, Serbia. In 2016 the Serbian government gave an officer's saber to the Peshkov family. A street at the Khmeimim Air Base in Syria bears his name.

See also 
 Ivan Gorbunov
 Alexander Prokhorenko
 Roman Filipov

References

1970 births
2015 deaths
Heroes of the Russian Federation
People of the Russo-Georgian War
Russian military personnel killed in the Syrian civil war
Russian aviators